Sonya Sklaroff (born November 7, 1970) is a contemporary American painter best known for her cityscapes of New York City.

Born in Philadelphia, Sklaroff attended Friends' Central School before earning her BFA from the Rhode Island School of Design.  While at RISD, Sklaroff won the Providence Art Award and was selected for the European Honors Program, where she studied under Robert Kelly. Sklaroff later received her MFA from the Parsons School of Design in New York City where she studied under Faith Ringgold and Glenn Goldberg. While a student at Parsons, Sklaroff received a grant from the Port Authority of New York and New Jersey, the World Views program, which provided her an artist's studio on the 91st floor of Tower 1 of the World Trade Center.

Early work
Sklaroff's early works were primarily representational views of cityscapes and landscapes with a focus on the relationship between negative space, complementary colors, and the contrast between light and dark. Her work from the World Trade Center, in the winter of 1999, used the vertical format of the windows to frame her views of the city.

More recent works, while still exploring these themes, have included greater detail and more prominently feature scenes including figures and rooftops. A 2009 New York exhibition of Sklaroff's work was reviewed in the Winter 2010 edition of American Arts Quarterly, which stated, "What gives her work its unique interest and power is her clever sense of color contrasts, along with reflections of light, depictions of shadows and smoky atmospheres."

This publication also noted, "Although she also paints country landscapes and interiors, she is best known for her images of New York City."  Her cityscapes are particularly noted for her inclusion of New York City's water towers, which display an almost anthropomorphic character. Many of her landscape paintings have been produced either in Maine or the American Southwest, where she has been an artist in residence at the Santa Fe Art Institute. Sklaroff continues a long tradition of artists painting on Monhegan Island, Maine an isolated site that she visits annually.

Sklaroff was interviewed by MyArtSpace.com in November 2007. She was later the subject of an eight-page article in the April 2010 issue of American Artist magazine. A Sklaroff exhibition in Versailles was featured in the May 2011 issue of ELLE magazine.  Sklaroff was featured in a 2-page spread  in the Fall/Winter 2019/2020 issue of RISD XYZ magazine.

Technique

Sklaroff considers herself to be a "creative athlete" who paints and draws daily as a mental and physical exercise to keep her skills in excellent form. Although the work is figurative, her focus is on the abstract shapes of a scene.
Interviewed by the Providence Journal in May 2012, Sklaroff discussed her interest in New York's unique architectural landscape and spoke of the challenge in capturing shifting effects of light.

Sklaroff is interviewed in Gala Lutteroth's short documentary film Water from Above, released in May 2012. She is also featured in Pierre Oertel's upcoming documentary film, New York Art City.

In 2017 she was featured in the first issue of Moriarty magazine.

Notable Works and Exhibitions

Collections with her work include the Phillips Museum of Art, the United States Department of Homeland Security, Fannie Mae, the Dana–Farber Cancer Institute, the Cahoon Museum of American Art, the Consul General of France (in New York City), and the Art Bank Program of the US State Department.

One of Sklaroff's paintings was used as the cover of the Summer 2009 issue of City Journal magazine. Another painting of Sklaroff's was featured on the cover of Ravi Shankar's Voluptuous Bristle in April 2010. Sklaroff was also included in New American Paintings: 15th Anniversary Edition published in early 2010 by Open Studios Press. Her work is also featured on a series of cards from Bayview Press.

A 2016 multimedia stage show called Jazz on the West Side used projections of Sklaroff's paintings. The show featured jazz interpretations of songs from West Side Story choreographed by Sue Samuels.

Sklaroff showed at Sparts Gallery in Paris in March 2016 and again in New York Portraits Part VI: Metropolis in Repose in March 2018. This was her 6th solo show at this gallery. Her work was on exhibition at the Galerie Anagama in Versailles, France in early 2015 and again for a solo exhibition in October 2017, her third show there.

In 2014, an artist monograph of Sklaroff's work was published in France with a foreword by Harlan Coben, who is an admirer and collector of her work. The North American release occurred in 2015. A show at Galerie Ferrari in Vevey, Switzerland is scheduled in the Fall 2018.

In 2020, Sklaroff was featured on the blog of The New School, which highlighted her pandemic paintings and displayed photographs of Sklaroff's work having been featured on 3,500 digital kiosks from LinkNYC all around New York City.

In December 2020, Sklaroff was interviewed by All Arts, the award-winning arts and culture hub created by the WNET Group.  And she is prominently featured in the award-winning documentary film Chuck Connelly:  Into the Light.

Teaching
Sklaroff is an associate professor of Drawing and Painting at Parsons School of Design in New York City.

References

External links
 Sonya Sklaroff's Instagram
 Sonya Sklaroff's faculty profile at New School University
 New York Times review

1970 births
Living people
Modern painters
Artists from New York (state)
American women painters
20th-century American painters
20th-century American women artists
21st-century American women artists
Friends' Central School alumni
Rhode Island School of Design alumni